William Milliken (1922–2019) was the 44th Governor of Michigan.

William Milliken may also refer to:
William H. Milliken Jr. (1897–1969), U.S. Representative from Pennsylvania
William F. Milliken Jr. (1911–2012), American aerospace engineer